Acacia coriacea subsp. coriacea is a subspecies of Acacia coriacea (river jam) that occurs in Western Australia and the Northern Territory.

See also
List of Acacia species

References

coriacea subsp. coriacea
Fabales of Australia
Trees of Australia
Acacias of Western Australia
Flora of the Northern Territory
Plant subspecies